Jean-Noël Dominique Lingani (born 12 December 1988) is a Burkinabé international footballer who plays for Horoya in Guinea as a defender.

Career
He played for Étoile Filante, RC Kadiogo and Horoya.

He made his international debut for Burkina Faso in 2013.

References

1988 births
Living people
Burkinabé footballers
Burkina Faso international footballers
Étoile Filante de Ouagadougou players
Rail Club du Kadiogo players
Horoya AC players
Association football defenders
Burkinabé expatriate footballers
Burkinabé expatriate sportspeople in Guinea
Expatriate footballers in Guinea
21st-century Burkinabé people